A national emblem is an emblem or seal that is reserved for use by a nation state or multi-national state as a symbol of that nation. Many nations have a seal or emblem in addition to a national flag. 

Other national symbols, such as national birds, trees, flowers, etc., are listed at lists of national symbols.

Terms: emblem, coats of arms, seal 
The design of a emblem is different to that of a coat of arms which should follow the rules of heraldry and so contain a shield (escutcheon) in the center. However, many unheraldic national emblems are colloquially called national coats of arms anyway, because they are used for the same purposes as national coats of arms.

Some designs of national emblems can be used one-to-one for a national seal.

The same for some national coats of arms like the Great Seal of the United States which is actually a coat of arms (achievement) on a seal.

National emblems by continent

In Africa

In the Americas

In Asia

In Europe

In Oceania

See also
Armorial of sovereign states

References 

 
Insignia